Jorge Sobrevila (born 26 February 1920, date of death unknown) was an Argentine cyclist. He competed in the time trial event at the 1948 Summer Olympics.

References

External links
 

1920 births
Year of death missing
Argentine male cyclists
Olympic cyclists of Argentina
Cyclists at the 1948 Summer Olympics
Place of birth missing
Pan American Games medalists in cycling
Pan American Games bronze medalists for Argentina
Cyclists at the 1951 Pan American Games
Medalists at the 1951 Pan American Games